The Lynx was an 8-bit British home computer that was first released in early 1983 as a 48 kB model. Several models were available with 48 kB, 96 kB or 128 kB RAM. It was possible to reach 192 kB with RAM expansions on board. John Shireff designed the hardware and Davis Jansons the firmware.

The machine was based around a Z80A CPU clocked at 4 MHz (6 MHz for the 128/192 kB models) and featured a Motorola 6845 as video controller. It was possible to run CP/M with the optional 5.25" floppy disk-drive on the 96 kB and 128 kB models.

The machine was quite advanced for its time. A 48k machine cost £225, a 96k machine £299 and a 128k machine £345. When compared to its competitors, such as the ZX Spectrum and the Oric 1, it was also fairly highly priced. Camputers rebranded and relaunched each machine on several occasions, with the 48k machine renamed the Leisure, and the 128k machine renamed as the Laureate.

The machine had very little software available, and survived only until Camputers ceased trading in June 1984. It is believed that approximately 30,000 Camputers Lynx units were sold worldwide.

Anston Technology took over in November 1984 and a re-launch was planned but never happened. In June 1986, Anston sold everything - hardware, design rights and thousands of cassettes - to the National Lynx User Group. The group planned to produce a Super-Lynx but was too busy supplying spares and technical information to owners of existing models, and the project never came into being.

Unique features of this computer (compared to other home computers at the time) includes:
 All numbers were floating point BCD numbers (even line numbers).
 The computer always ran in "high" resolution graphics mode (256x252 pixels in eight colours) using 6 times 10 pixels characters.  Only a few bytes of graphic memory could be manipulated during the horizontal sync period, and thus graphics were extremely slow compared to most other computers.
 Up to 192 kB of RAM and 20 kB of ROM (16 kB on the smallest model) on a 16 bit address bus was implemented using special hardware.  As a consequence, certain RAM areas shadowed by ROM could only be used for data storage and the video memory had a green and alternative green bank that could be switched by a hardware register.
 For sound it had a simple (6 bit) DAC.  A comparator was included to serve as an ADC (primarily used for reading from tape drives).

Compared to, for example, the Commodore 64, the BASIC was more extensive and faster and resolution of graphics was better; but computer games on the other hand suffered from the special implementation and lack of hardware for sound and sprites.

Reception
After seeing a preview of the Camputers Lynx at the Personal Computer World Show, BYTE in January 1983 stated that it "offers more computing power for the money than any other machine I saw there". Computing Today in June 1983 criticized the manual as "put together in something of a hurry ... confusing" and criticized the computer for not meeting published specifications and having manufacturing defects. It concluded that the Lynx "could be seen as a flawed jewel ... If the less satisfactory aspects can be put to rights, it could prove to be a very popular machine. That, however, could entail some sacrifices."

References

Camputers Lynx
Computer-related introductions in 1983